Andoins is a commune in the Pyrénées-Atlantiques department in the Nouvelle-Aquitaine region of southwestern France.

The inhabitants of the commune are known as Andosiens or Andosiennes.

Geography

Location

The commune is part of the urban area of Pau and is located 5 km east of Pau (five miles), the commune is part of the Vic-Bilh region of Gascony.

Access
The commune is traversed by the A64 autoroute however there is no exit in the commune. The nearest exit is Exit 11 just south-east of the commune. Access to the village is by the D39 road from Morlaàs in the north-west which continues south-east to Limendous. There is also the D538 which goes north-west from the village to Serres-Morlaàs. There is also the D215 which goes south-west from the village to Artigueloutan.

Hydrography
Located in the drainage basin of the Adour, the commune is traversed from south-east to north-west by the Luy de France which forms part of the northern border before continuing to join the Lucet east of Morlaàs.

The Ayguelengue forms the southern border of the commune before joining the Oussere and continuing west.

Localities and hamlets

 Lous Augas
 Baradat
 Barrails
 Bégué
 Bordenave
 Capdepon
 Cazaux
 Cazenave
 Courriades
 Freitet
 Gabaix
 Las Grabes
 Hourcade
 Lapoutge
 Laulhé
 Grange Laulhé
 Lendrat
 Minvielle
 Grange Montané
 Pé-deu-Boscq
 Peyré
 Poublan
 Puyau
 Teulé
 Troubet
 Vergez

Neighbouring communes and villages

Toponymy
The commune name in béarnais is Andonsh. (according to the classical norm of Occitan).

Brigitte Jobbé-Duval indicates that the village's name probably comes from the family name Antonius, modified in basque to Anton plus the suffix -tz inducing the property of or the domain of Anton.

The following table details the origins of the commune name and other names in the commune.

Sources:
Raymond: Topographic Dictionary of the Department of Basses-Pyrenees, 1863, on the page numbers indicated in the table. 

Origins:
Lescar: Cartulary of Lescar
Pau: Cartulary of the Château of Pau
Fors de Béarn
Census: Census of Béarn
Ossau: Cartulary of Ossau.

History
Paul Raymond on page 5 of the 1863 dictionary noted  that Andoins was the seat of the second largest barony in Béarn which also included Limendous. He also noted that in 1385 there were 20 fires in Andoins and it depended on the Bailiwick of Pau.
 
The town was part of the archdeaconry of Vic-Bilh, which depended on the bishopric of Lescar of which Lembeye was the capital.

Heraldry

Administration
List of Successive Mayors

Intercommunality
Andois is part of six inter-communal structures:
the public agency for local management;
the Communauté de communes du Nord-Est Béarn;
the AEP association of the Ousse Valley;
the energy association for Pyrénées-Atlantiques;
the intercommunal association for consolidation of the communes of the plain of Ousse;
the intercommunal association for the construction of the rescue centre at Soumoulou.

Demography
In 2017 the commune had 637 inhabitants.

Culture and Heritage

Civil heritage
The commune has a number of buildings that are registered as historical monuments:
A House at Grange Montane (19th century)
A Fortified Area (11th century)
A Farmhouse at Poublan (1904)
The Maison Séries Farmhouse (1913)
The Maison Lacaze Farmhouse (18th century)
The Cazenave Farmhouse (1899)
The Maison Coustet Farmhouse (18th century)
Houses and Farms (18th - 20th centuries)

Religious heritage
The Parish Church of Saint-Laurent (19th century) is registered as an historical monument. The church contains many items that are registered as historical objects:

The Furniture in the Church
An Altar Vase (19th century)
A Sunburst Monstrance (19th century)
A Lantern (19th century)
A Thurible (17th century)
2 Processional Crosses (19th century)
A Painting: Stations of the Cross (1883)
A Candlestick (18th century)
4 Candlesticks (19th century)
A Group Sculpture: Education of the Virgin (19th century)
A Mural Painting: Scenes from the life of Saint Lawrence (19th century)
3 Chandeliers (19th century)
A Sideboard (19th century)
A Chair and 3 Prie-dieux (19th century)
The Choir Enclosure (1850)
A central Stoup (19th century)
An Altar and Tabernacle (1845)
An Altar Cross (18th century)
2 Statues: Saint Peter and Saint Paul (1740 & 1760)
Altar seating and a Tabernacle (1740 & 1760)
Secondary Altar (1864)
The whole Altar of the Blessed Sacrament (18th century)
An Altar, Tabernacle, and 4 Altar Candlesticks (1841)
4 Stained glass windows (Bays 1-4) (1923)

Notable people linked to the commune
Guilhem Arnaud, Baron of Andoins who died in 1301. His funerary monument is displayed in the church of the Commandery of Caubin in the commune of Arthez-de-Béarn.

See also
Communes of the Pyrénées-Atlantiques department

References

External links
Andoins on Géoportail, National Geographic Institute (IGN) website 
Andoins on the 1750 Cassini Map

Communes of Pyrénées-Atlantiques